A slave market is a place where slaves are bought and sold.

Slave market may also refer to:

Paintings 
The Slave Market (Gérôme painting), an 1866 painting by Jean-Léon Gérôme
The Slave Market (Boulanger painting), an 1882 painting by Gustave Boulanger
Slave Market with the Disappearing Bust of Voltaire, a 1940 painting by Salvador Dalí

Cinema 
The Slave Market (film), a 1917 American silent film